The Take Off Your Pants and Jacket Tour was a concert tour by rock band Blink-182. Launched in support of the group's 2001 album Take Off Your Pants and Jacket, the tour visited amphitheatres and arenas between July and September 2001. The tour was supported by New Found Glory, Jimmy Eat World, Alkaline Trio and Midtown.

A planned European leg of the tour was postponed following the September 11 attacks, and cancelled when guitarist Tom DeLonge suffered a back injury.

Background
The band partnered with Ticketmaster, setting up a special website where fans could purchase pre-sale tickets for each show.

In the wake of the September 11 attacks, the band draped an American flag over a set of amplifiers and drummer Travis Barker played on a red, white, and blue drum kit. At one concert, DeLonge invited the crowd to join him in his cheers of "Fuck Osama bin Laden!"

Tour dates

Festivals and other miscellaneous performances

Reception
Reception towards the Take Off Your Pants and Jacket Tour was generally positive. Jim DeRogatis of the Chicago Sun-Times was positive in his review of the band's concert at the Tweeter Center, writing, "There is a long and noble tradition in rock 'n' roll of hyperenergetic, ultramelodic, sha-la-la-la stupidity, and Blink has proven itself to be a worthy inheritor of this tradition—not as great as the mighty Ramones just yet, but at least as good as the Troggs or the Archies or Grand Funk Railroad." The band's appearance at Radio 104 Fest in Hartford, Connecticut was reviewed by Roger Catlin of the Hartford Courant: "Blink-182 [...] has earned its place at the top. Both bassist Mark Hoppus and guitarist Tom DeLonge are tighter now from working with ace drummer Travis Barker for a few years. The show's focus is more their bracing, melodic songs rather than the childishly vulgar banter between them."

Ed Masley of the Pittsburgh Post-Gazette called the trio "the Steely Dan of cartoon punk", feeling that "the [dirty] jokes were nearly overshadowed by musical highlights [...] Some, I'm sure, would argue that the show was worse than reprehensible. But unlike, say, Limp Bizkit, Korn or Eminem, these clowns did it all for the giggles. At a time when so much of teen culture is focused on hate and aggression, last night's show was practically refreshing." Randy Lewis of the Los Angeles Times felt the concert tasteful in light of the then-recent September 11 attacks; "In some strange way Blink-182's concert Sunday at the Arrowhead Pond in Anaheim provided a kind of catharsis, or at least temporary escape, for the thousands of fans who turned out." He praised the group's inclusion of humor, while also comparing drummer Travis Barker to Keith Moon of The Who.

Notes

External links
 

Blink-182 concert tours
2001 concert tours